Muhammad Rizky Eka Pratama (born 24 December 1999) is an Indonesian professional footballer who plays as a winger for Liga 1 club PSM Makassar.

Club career

PSM Makassar
He was signed for PSM Makassar to play in Liga 1 in the 2019 season. Rizky Eka made his debut on 27 September 2019 in a match against Persipura Jayapura. On 18 November 2019, Rizky scored his first goal for PSM against Persipura Jayapura in the 34th minute at the Andi Mattalatta Stadium, Makassar.

International career
In November 2019, Rizky was named as Indonesia U-20 All Stars squad, to play in U-20 International Cup held in Bali.

Career statistics

Club

Honours

Club
PSM Makassar
 Piala Indonesia: 2019

References

External links
 Rizky Eka Pratama at Soccerway
 Rizky Eka Pratama at Liga Indonesia

1999 births
Living people
Indonesian footballers
Liga 1 (Indonesia) players
PSM Makassar players
Association football forwards
People from Bone Regency
Sportspeople from South Sulawesi